Isaac Higgin (c.1789-1832) was a London merchant, planter and slave owner in Jamaica. He was elected to the House of Assembly of Jamaica in 1820.

References 

Jamaican landowners
Members of the House of Assembly of Jamaica
British slave owners
19th-century British businesspeople
19th-century Jamaican people
1780s births
Year of birth uncertain
1832 deaths